Miami Valley Christian Academy is a private, non-denominational Christian school located on the east side of Cincinnati in Newtown, Ohio, United States.  MVCA educates children aged Preschool - 12th Grade.  The curriculum provides college preparatory academic instruction from a Biblical worldview.  Fine arts, athletics, and other co-curriculars complement their core subjects.

History
In February 1994, the Elders of Faith Christian Fellowship Church (FCFC) and Pastor Edgar Bonniwell of Cincinnati, Ohio asked Mary Lou and Edward Wambach, to research the requirements for beginning a Christian school. The Wambachs visited the Ohio State Board of Education and a number of Christian schools within a 150-mile radius of Cincinnati. Their research was aided by the Association of Christian Schools International (ACSI), Christian school administrators and a number of local parents. After concluding their efforts, they were asked by the FCFC Elders to develop a plan to establish a Christian school in the Newtown school building which was then owned by the church.
 
In October 1994, the first meeting of the school committee was held. A preliminary plan for a school was adopted. The ten founding members of the committee became the Board of Trustees of Miami Valley Christian Academy. They were as follows: Edward N. and Mary Lou Wambach, Dr. Henry E. and Marilyn Wedig, John and Ellen Maloy, James and Jennifer Simunek, and Paul and Phyllis Zender. The goal was to open a private, independently incorporated, non-denominational Christian school. Primarily to provide an education in a Christian environment. The plan was to begin classes at Miami Valley Christian Academy (MVCA) beginning August 1996.
 
Robert S. Marriott, an attorney and Christian worked with Graydon, Head and Ritchey, to prepare the Ohio State Incorporation papers and acquire the 501(c)(3) recognition of tax exemption. The MVCA Constitution and Code of Regulations were prepared by the board of trustees with help from the Association of Christian Schools International (ACSI), Ed Reck of World Harvest Christian School and Bud Schindler of Dayton Christian Schools.  
 
In November 1995, Mr. Andrew Lowe, a public school principal became the headmaster of MVCA. He worked to develop the curriculum, hire teachers, write manuals, and he applied for a State Charter. He played an instrumental role in the development of MVCA. Alongside this, the board of trustees and many others worked to clean, paint, and decorate the school in preparation for the opening day. MVCA was established on August 21, 1996. It educated five kindergartners and six first graders. Several teachers, such as Mrs. Kathy Morris and Mrs. LaRae Bircher taught without remuneration. From fall 2004 to 2005 a new middle and high school were erected on the Miami Valley Christian Academy campus.

On October 24, 2019, the school received enough funding to begin groundbreaking on a new all-weather sports fields along the campus. In 2020, the construction on the field was completed and available for official games to be played on.

References

Christian schools in Ohio
High schools in Hamilton County, Ohio
Nondenominational Christian schools in the United States
Private high schools in Ohio
Private middle schools in Ohio
Private elementary schools in Ohio